Following is a list of senators of French Polynesia, people who have represented the collectivity of French Polynesia in the Senate of France.

Fourth Republic

Senators for Oceania (Océanie) under the French Fourth Republic were:

 Joseph Quesnot (1946-1949) died in office
 Robert Lassalle-Sere (1949–1953)
 Jean Florisson (1953–1958)

Fifth Republic 
Senators for French Polynesia under the French Fifth Republic were:

References

Sources

 
Lists of members of the Senate (France) by department